Gordon Leigh "Jack" Bloomfield (born August 7, 1932) is a retired American infielder, scout and coach in professional baseball.

Biography
Bloomfield was a second baseman, shortstop and third baseman in his playing days. He signed with the Kansas City Athletics in 1955. His first professional experience came with the Harlingen Capitals of the Class B Big State League, where he batted .310. Bloomfield was then drafted by the Milwaukee Braves and played the bulk of his six-year U.S. professional career in the Braves' and Cincinnati Reds' organizations, once again breaking the .300 mark with the 1958 Seattle Rainiers of the Pacific Coast League.  Ironically, his final stint as a minor league player came with the Athletics, playing for their Triple-A Portland Beavers affiliate from July 15, 1959, through May 27, 1960.

He then played professional baseball in Japan during the 1960s (for the Kintetsu Buffaloes and the Nankai Hawks), where he compiled a .315 batting average and a .472 slugging percentage in more than 2400 at-bats. He led the Pacific League in batting twice, with averages of .374 in 1962, and .335 in 1963. Bloomfield was also infamous for an incident in 1961 when the Buffaloes were visiting the Hankyu Braves at Hankyu Nishinomiya Stadium. During the game, a Braves fan leaned into the dugout and yelled "Yankee go home" to Bloomfield, who proceeded to go to the stands and punch said fan. He was fined ¥50,000 and was suspended for 7 days. To date, it remains one of the only incidents involving a player punching a fan in NPB.

Major League coach
He returned to the U.S. in 1967, becoming a scout for the San Diego Padres in their first season, .

Bloomfield later scouted for the New York Yankees, Houston Astros, Pittsburgh Pirates, Colorado Rockies and Montreal Expos.

References

External links

1932 births
Living people
American expatriate baseball players in Japan
Austin Senators players
Chicago Cubs coaches
Chicago Cubs scouts
Colorado Rockies scouts
Harlingen Capitals players
Houston Astros scouts
Major League Baseball scouts
Montreal Expos scouts
New York Yankees scouts
People from Hidalgo County, Texas
Pittsburgh Pirates scouts
Portland Beavers players
Salt Lake City Bees players
San Diego Padres coaches
San Diego Padres scouts
Seattle Rainiers players
Topeka Hawks players
Kintetsu Buffaloes players
Nankai Hawks players